José Omar Justavino (born December 2, 1981) is a Panama football striker.

Club career
Justavino played for local side Plaza Amador and in August 2003, he moved abroad to join Argentinian third division side Racing Córdoba alongside compatriot Ricardo Buitrago.

El Gato was brought to F.C. Motagua in Honduras in December 2007 from San Francisco by Ramón Maradiaga after viewing his performance in the 2007 Central American regional club tournament against Olimpia and F.C. Motagua. However, he did not last very long in Honduras and returned to Panama to play with Árabe Unido.

In January 2012 he joined Chorrillo from Sporting San Miguelito and in summer 2012 he moved to Plaza Amador for the 2012 Apertura season.

International career
Justavino made his debut for Panama in a 2003 UNCAF Nations Cup match against El Salvador and has earned a total of 11 caps, scoring no goals. He represented his country at the 2003 UNCAF Nations Cup, his sole international tournament.

His final international was a May 2005 friendly match against Venezuela.

Honors
Club

National Titles
'''Liga Panameña de Fútbol: Apertura 2009 II

References

1.

External links

1981 births
Living people
Panamanian footballers
Panama international footballers
2003 UNCAF Nations Cup players
C.D. Plaza Amador players
Racing de Córdoba footballers
San Francisco F.C. players
F.C. Motagua players
C.D. Árabe Unido players
Sporting San Miguelito players
Unión Deportivo Universitario players
Panamanian expatriate footballers
Expatriate footballers in Argentina
Expatriate footballers in Honduras
Liga Nacional de Fútbol Profesional de Honduras players
Association football forwards
Association football midfielders